Sayo Nole is one of the Aanaas in the Oromia Region of Ethiopia. It was part of Nole Kaba woreda. It is part of the West Welega Zone.

Demographics 
The 2007 national census reported a total population for this woreda of 76,013, of whom 37,563 were men and 38,450 were women; 2,332 or 3.07% of its population were urban dwellers. The majority of the inhabitants observed Protestantism, with 74.76% reporting that as their religion, while 12.74% were Muslim, and 12.08% observed Ethiopian Orthodox Christianity.

Notes 

Districts of Oromia Region